Lilas is a village in Iran.

Lilas can also mean:

 Les Lilas, in Paris, France
 Porte des Lilas (Paris Métro), a Métro station
 Lilás, the sixth album of Brazilian singer and songwriter Djavan, released in 1984